The 1999 Alabama Crimson Tide football team represented the University of Alabama in the 1999 college football season. The team was led by head coach Mike DuBose, who was in his third season with the program. The Crimson Tide, also known informally as the Tide, played their home games at Bryant–Denny Stadium, in Tuscaloosa, Alabama, and Legion Field, in Birmingham, Alabama.

The team entered the season trying to build upon a 7–5 record from their 1998 season. The 1999 team had tremendous success. After a stunning last second loss to Louisiana Tech early in the year, they eventually finished with a 9–2 regular season record (7–1 in the SEC). This included defeating Auburn on the road for the first time ever. The team went on to the 1999 SEC Championship Game where they defeated Florida for the second time for the year. Alabama played Michigan in the 2000 Orange Bowl and suffered a 35–34 loss in overtime, due to a missed extra point. Alabama had beaten Florida during the regular season by a single point in overtime, also due to a missed extra point.

Schedule

Rankings

Roster

Coaching staff

Game summaries

Vanderbilt

Shaun Alexander scored the final two touchdowns in the 4th quarter to rally Alabama to a season opening road win over Vanderbilt.

Houston

Alabama would go over 500 yards of offense for just the second time in the Mike Dubose era and win convincingly over Houston.

Louisiana Tech

Back-up quarterback Brian Stallworth would find Sean Cangelosi in the end zone with two seconds left as Louisiana Tech would upset Alabama for the second time in three years.

Arkansas

Despite turning the football over six times, Alabama would manage to hold on and upset #14 Arkansas at Bryant-Denny Stadium. This would be the first time under Mike Dubose that Alabama beat a ranked opponent at home.

Florida

The Crimson Tide snapped No. 3 Florida's 30-game winning streak at The Swamp when Chris Kemp got a second chance on an extra-point attempt in overtime and drilled it.

Ole Miss

Despite having a 27-7 lead midway through the third quarter, Alabama had to hold on late to beat Ole Miss. This win extended Alabama win streak to 3 games in a row, the longest since 1996.

Tennessee

For the first time since 1930, the Third Saturday in October would be in Tuscaloosa. Despite having the largest crowd ever to watch a football game in the state of Alabama to date, The Crimson Tide could not generate enough offense to beat Tennessee. This gave the Volunteers their fifth win in a row against Alabama.

Southern Miss

Behind the Alabama defense who would hold Southern Miss to -13 yards rushing, Alabama would generate enough points with a pick six and a punt return to beat Southern Miss for the eight year in a row.

LSU

The 1999 version of a Goal Line stand as Alabama would deny LSU quarterback Josh Booty of a potential game winning touchdown run by knocking him down six inches short of the end zone to win.

Mississippi State

With the help of three Mississippi State interceptions, Alabama would end their three game losing streak to the Bulldogs and be one win away from winning the SEC West.

Auburn

Shaun Alexander scored all three of Alabama touchdowns in the fourth quarter as the Crimson Tide rallied back for the second year in a row to beat Auburn. This would also be the first time Alabama won at Jordan-Hare Stadium. With the win, Alabama clinched the SEC West for the first time since 1996.

Florida

Alabama used 34 unanswered points to beat Florida for the second time in 1999. This would be the Crimson Tide's first SEC Championship since 1992.

Michigan

Despite holding a 14 point lead in the third quarter, Alabama could not hold on and would lose in Overtime on a missed extra point by Ryan Pflugner.

References

Alabama
Alabama Crimson Tide football seasons
Southeastern Conference football champion seasons
Alabama Crimson Tide football